Francisco Pungo (born 13 April 1998) is a Colombian footballer who currently plays for CD Escuela Carlos Sarmiento Lora.

References

1998 births
Association football forwards
Colombian expatriate footballers
Colombian footballers
Expatriate soccer players in the United States
Living people
Rio Grande Valley FC Toros players
USL Championship players